Francesco Beltramini (1522–1575) was a Roman Catholic prelate who served as Bishop of Terracina, Priverno e Sezze  (1564–1575) and Apostolic Nuncio to France (1565–1566).

Biography
Francesco Beltramini was born in Colle Val d'Elsa, Italy in 1522.
On 21 Jun 1564, he was appointed during the papacy of Pope Julius III as Bishop of Terracina, Priverno e Sezze.
On 29 Jul 1565, he was consecrated bishop by Jean Suau, Cardinal-Priest of Santa Prisca, with Ascanio Albertini, Bishop of Avellino e Frigento, serving as co-consecrators. 
In Oct 1565, he was appointed during the papacy of Pope Paul IV as Apostolic Nuncio to France; he resigned from this position on 25 Mar 1566.
He served as Bishop of Terracina, Priverno e Sezze until his death in 1575 in Terracina, Italy.

References

External links and additional sources
 (for Chronology of Bishops) 
 (for Chronology of Bishops) 
 (for Chronology of Bishops) 
 (for Chronology of Bishops) 

16th-century Italian Roman Catholic bishops
Bishops appointed by Pope Julius III
Bishops appointed by Pope Paul IV
1522 births
1575 deaths
Apostolic Nuncios to France